ABM Abul Kashem was a Bangladesh Awami League politician and the former Member of Parliament from Chittagong-2

Career
Kashem was elected to Parliament in 2008 from Chittagong-3 as a Bangladesh Awami League candidate. He served as the Chairmman Parliamentary Committee for the Ministry of Commerce.

Controversy
Kashem's son, SM Al Mamun, tried to grab land from ship breaking companies in Sitakunda Upazila for his ship breaking company, Unique Ship-breaking Yard, on 7 October 2009. His son also assaulted journalists trying to cover the incident. Kashem later apologized for his son's actions.

Death
Kashem died on 24 November 2015 in Square Hospital, Dhaka, Bangladesh.

References

Awami League politicians
2015 deaths
7th Jatiya Sangsad members
9th Jatiya Sangsad members